Veselin Marchev (born 7 February 1990) is a Bulgarian footballer who plays as a winger for Maritsa Plovdiv.

Career
On 12 June 2018, Marchev signed with Arda.

References

External links

Profile at LPortala

1990 births
Living people
Footballers from Plovdiv
Bulgarian footballers
Bulgaria under-21 international footballers
First Professional Football League (Bulgaria) players
Second Professional Football League (Bulgaria) players
I liga players
Cypriot First Division players
PFC Lokomotiv Plovdiv players
FC Septemvri Simitli players
OFC Sliven 2000 players
PFC Cherno More Varna players
Flota Świnoujście players
PFC Pirin Gotse Delchev players
PFC Slavia Sofia players
Ayia Napa FC players
Nea Salamis Famagusta FC players
FC Arda Kardzhali players
FC Hebar Pazardzhik players
FC Maritsa Plovdiv players
Bulgarian expatriate footballers
Bulgarian expatriate sportspeople in Poland
Expatriate footballers in Poland
Bulgarian expatriate sportspeople in Cyprus
Expatriate footballers in Cyprus
Association football wingers